Rashaan Iman Salaam (October 8, 1974 – December 5, 2016) was an American college and professional football player who was a running back in the National Football League (NFL) for four seasons during the 1990s.  Salaam played college football for the University of Colorado and won the 1994 Heisman Trophy.  He was picked by the Chicago Bears in the first round of the 1995 NFL Draft, and played professionally for the Bears and Cleveland Browns of the NFL.  Salaam died by suicide on December 5, 2016.

Early years
Salaam was born in San Diego, California, the son of former Cincinnati Bengals running back Teddy Washington (later Sulton Salaam, after converting to Islam). He was a practicing Muslim. He attended La Jolla Country Day School in suburban San Diego, and played  eight-man football.  He ran for over 100 yards in every game except against Christian High of El Cajon coached by Dale Peterson. And was recognized as a high school All-American.  He was later inducted into the school's athletic hall of fame.

College career

Salaam attended the University of Colorado, where he played for the Colorado Buffaloes football team from 1992 to 1994.  As a junior in 1994, Salaam had one of the best individual seasons in college football history, rushing for a school-record 2,055 yards and becoming only the fourth college running back to run for more than 2,000 yards in a season.  He also amassed 24 touchdowns and helped lead Colorado to an 11–1 record, including a 41–24 win over the Notre Dame Fighting Irish in the 1995 Fiesta Bowl, and a No. 3 finish in the final Associated Press Poll.  The Buffaloes' only loss of the season was to the Big Eight Conference rival Nebraska Cornhuskers, which finished undefeated and ranked No. 1 in both the Associated Press and United Press International polls at season's end.  Salaam had four consecutive 200-yard rushing games during the season, his best effort coming against the Texas Longhorns, when he set a school record with 362 yards total offense in a 34–31 Colorado win in Austin.  He was a unanimous first-team All-American and winner of the Heisman Trophy in December, beating out running back Ki-Jana Carter of Penn State and quarterbacks Steve McNair of Alcorn State and Kerry Collins of Penn State. Salaam also won the Walter Camp Award and Doak Walker Award.

Professional career

The Chicago Bears selected Salaam in the first round, with the 21st overall selection, of the 1995 NFL Draft. As a rookie, he rushed for 1,074 yards and scored 10 touchdowns. However, he also lost 9 fumbles and averaged just 3.6 yards per carry. Problems with injuries, fumbles, and marijuana use led him to spend only three years with the Bears. During his two final years with Chicago, Salaam mustered only 608 combined yards. The Bears traded Salaam to the Miami Dolphins before the 1998 season, but the trade was undone when Salaam failed a physical examination with Miami. Salaam spent 1999 with the Cleveland Browns and the Green Bay Packers, but only played in two games for the Browns that year.

Salaam briefly played in the XFL for the Memphis Maniax in 2001, but injury cut his season short and the league folded after one season.  He finished the year with 528 yards gained.

He was picked up by the San Francisco 49ers in  but subsequently let go in August, in the second-to-last round of cuts, despite receiving accolades from then 49ers head coach Dennis Erickson.

Salaam was signed by the Toronto Argonauts of the Canadian Football League (CFL) on February 20, 2004.  He was then suspended by the Argos in May, effectively ending his career.

Death 
Salaam was found dead on December 5, 2016, in a park in Boulder, Colorado. An autopsy was performed because authorities found a note near the body and were investigating it as a possible suicide.

On December 29, it was confirmed that the manner of death was suicide, specifically a gunshot wound to the head, in a report released by the Boulder County coroner's office. Salaam's blood-alcohol content was reportedly three times the legal driving limit and he had THC in his system.

Salaam's family did not consent to neuropathological tests that would have revealed whether he had previously sustained chronic head trauma, such as chronic traumatic encephalopathy. They declined to have his brain tested to determine whether his depression had been linked to such injuries from his days as a player.

NFL records
 Youngest player in NFL history to rush for 1,000 yards

See also 

 List of Heisman Trophy winners
 List of NCAA major college football yearly rushing leaders
 List of NCAA major college football yearly scoring leaders

References

External links
 
 

1974 births
2016 deaths
African-American Muslims
American Muslims
African-American players of American football
All-American college football players
American football running backs
Chicago Bears players
Cleveland Browns players
College Football Hall of Fame inductees
Colorado Buffaloes football players
Heisman Trophy winners
Memphis Maniax players
Players of American football from San Diego
Players of Canadian football from San Diego
Suicides by firearm in Colorado
2016 suicides
20th-century African-American sportspeople
21st-century African-American sportspeople
Brian Piccolo Award winners